1-(2-Pyrimidinyl)piperazine (1-PP, 1-PmP) is a chemical compound and piperazine derivative. It is known to act as an antagonist of the α2-adrenergic receptor (Ki = 7.3–40 nM) and, to a much lesser extent, as a partial agonist of the 5-HT1A receptor (Ki = 414 nM; Emax = 54%). It has negligible affinity for the dopamine D2, D3, and D4 receptors (Ki > 10,000 nM) and does not appear to have significant affinity for the α1-adrenergic receptors. Its crystal structure has been determined.

Derivatives
A number of pyrimidinylpiperazine derivatives are drugs, including:

 Buspirone - anxiolytic
 Dasatinib - anticancer agent
 Eptapirone - anxiolytic
 Gepirone - anxiolytic
 Ipsapirone - anxiolytic
 Piribedil - antiparkinsonian agent
 Revospirone - anxiolytic
 Tandospirone - anxiolytic
 Tirilazad - neuroprotective agent
 Umespirone - anxiolytic
 Zalospirone - anxiolytic

The anxiolytics are also classified as azapirones due to the azaspirodecanedione moiety in their structures. 1-PP is a common metabolite of most or all of the listed agents. Alnespirone, binospirone, and enilospirone, despite being azapirones, are not piperazines and therefore do not metabolize to 1-PP, and while perospirone and tiospirone are piperazines, they are instead benzothiazole-substituted piperazines and do not metabolize to 1-PP either.

See also
 Substituted piperazine
 Pyridinylpiperazine
 Phenylpiperazine
 Diphenylmethylpiperazine
 Benzylpiperazine

References

5-HT1A agonists
Alpha-2 blockers
Human drug metabolites
Piperazines
Aminopyrimidines
Guanidines